Presidential elections were held for the first time in Madagascar on 30 March 1965. Incumbent President Philibert Tsiranana of the Social Democratic Party dominated the campaign and was elected with 97.2% of the voter.

Results

References

Presidential elections in Madagascar
Madagascar
Presidential election
Malagasy presidential election